Kenneth Wayne Huxhold (born August 10, 1929) was a player in the National Football League for the Philadelphia Eagles from 1954 to 1958 as a guard. Huxhold was previously drafted in the 27th round of the 1951 NFL Draft by the Chicago Cardinals. He played at the collegiate level at the University of Wisconsin–Madison.

Biography
Huxhold was born Kenneth Wayne Huxhold on August 10, 1929, in Kenosha, Wisconsin. He retired from professional football in 1959 and started working for the International Paper company.

See also
List of Philadelphia Eagles players

References

Sportspeople from Kenosha, Wisconsin
Players of American football from Wisconsin
Philadelphia Eagles players
American football offensive guards
Wisconsin Badgers football players
1929 births
Living people